is a form of Japanese poetry using Chinese characters which was popular around 1770–1800. Kyōshi avoids typical poetic forms, and often includes humorous expressions and puns on alternate readings or meanings of the same characters.

Mostly written by low-ranking samurai and chōnin (townspeople), the form is closely related to kyōka (comic waka), and to kyōbun, a form of prose writing which also uses only Chinese characters.

Ōta Nanpo is the best-known of kyōshi poets; the form was very popular for a short time, but declined quickly and disappeared after the turn of the 19th century.

References
Frederic, Louis (2002). "Japan Encyclopedia." Cambridge, Massachusetts: Harvard University Press.

Japanese poetry